The Siemens Mireo is a family of electric multiple units (EMU) designed by Siemens Mobility.  It is designed to be a successor to the "Mainline" variant of the company's Desiro EMUs.

The railcars have an articulated design and aluminum carbodies, with  cab cars on each end of a trainset and  passenger cars between them, with trainsets between two and seven cars long. The use of aluminum, combined with new control systems, is intended to reduce energy use by up to 25%. compared to previous Siemens EMUs. Siemens Mobility is currently working on a hydrogen fuel cell prototype.

Siemens introduced the first Mireo railcars at the 2016 InnoTrans trade fair. The first units were ordered in February 2017 by DB Regio, which ordered 24 three-car trainsets with a passenger capacity of 220 for service on its routes in the Rhine valley in southwestern Germany.  DB Regio ordered a further 57 three-car high-density sets for S-Bahn service. Production of Mireo trainsets began in 2018, with the first completed set unveiled in early December.  Following testing, Mireo trains are expected to enter revenue service in June 2020.

Mireo Plus H 
Siemens and Ballard Power Systems are developing a fuel cell system for the trains, which is expected to be operational in 2021.

Mireo Plus B 
A battery equipped variant had been developed. It is able to run on both electrified lines (taking current from the catenary) and unelectrified lines (using the batteries). It can travel  on unelectrified lines.

In August 2019,  ordered 20 battery-electric Mireos. They will be used on the electrified Offenburg - Freudenstadt/Hornberg line (Kinzig Valley Railway) and on several unelectrified lines (Rench Valley Railway, Harmersbach Valley Railway and Acher Valley Railway)

Mireo Smart 
In November 2020, Siemens unveiled the Mireo Smart. This is a standardized product aiming for attractive pricing and faster delivery. It includes features such as more advanced CCTV systems, improved passenger information systems, and full testing before delivery.

References

Siemens multiple units
Electric multiple units of Germany